Marina Alexandrovna Yakusheva (born 19 June 1974 in Moscow, Soviet Union) is a badminton player from Russia. She was the 1996 European runner-up.

Yakusheva competed in badminton at the 2004 Summer Olympics in mixed doubles with partner Nikolai Zuyev. They were defeated by Anggun Nugroho and Eny Widiowati of Indonesia in the round of 32. In her home country of Russia she won 13 national titles.

References
 European results
 

1974 births
Living people
Olympic badminton players of Russia
Badminton players at the 1996 Summer Olympics
Badminton players at the 2000 Summer Olympics
Badminton players at the 2004 Summer Olympics
Russian female badminton players